Alawwa is a town and divisional secretariat  of the Kurunegala District in the North Western Province of Sri Lanka. The town is considered part of the Coconut Triangle, where most of the country's coconut exports come from. The population was 63,667 at the 2012 Sri Lankan census.

Transport 
Alawwa has well established road and railway links. The city is located on the A6 (Ambepussa - Trincomallee Road). The B8 (Alawwa - Dampelessa Road), B9 (Alawwa - Maharagama Road), B539 (Nelundeniya - Alawwa Road) and many other regional roads emanate from Alawwa.

Schools
 Abbowa Maha Vidyalaya
 Boyawalana Maha Vidyalaya
 Humbuluwa central college
 Kandegedara Maha Vidyalaya
 Madawala Maha Vidyalaya
 Nungamuwa Damsen Central College
 Sri Rahula central college
 Rathanalankara Maha Vidyalaya
 Walakubura Maha Viddalaya
 Wayamba President College Pambadeniya
 Wewala Maha Vidyalaya

Librarys
 Alawwa Public Library
 Boyawalana Public Library
 Maharachchimulla Public Library

Hospitals
 Alawwa Regional Hospital
 Nawathalwattha Hospital

Cinema Halls
 Cinemaal Movie Theater
 Sarasavi Cinema

See also
 Alawwa railway station
 2011 Alawwa rail accident

References

External links 
 Alawwa Divisional Secretariat
 Divisional Secretariats Portal

Populated places in North Western Province, Sri Lanka
Populated places in Kurunegala District